Al-Hasakah Governorate (also known as ) is one of the fourteen governorates (provinces) of Syria. It is located in the far north-east corner of Syria and distinguished by its fertile lands, plentiful water, natural environment, and more than one hundred archaeological sites. It was formerly known as Al-Jazira Province. Prior to the Syrian Civil War nearly half of Syria's oil was extracted from the region. It is the lower part of Upper Mesopotamia. 

Most of the territory is controlled by the Autonomous Administration of North and East Syria (AANES), which as part of the ongoing Rojava conflict, on 21 January 2014 declared democratic autonomy on the area of Al-Hakasa Governorate as the Jazira Region, the largest of the three original regions of AANES.

Geography 

During the Abbasid era, the area that makes this province used to be part of the Diyar Rabi'a administrative unit, corresponding to the southern part of Upper Mesopotamia. Kurdistan did not include the lands of Syrian Jazira. The Treaty of Sèvres' putative Kurdistan did not include any part of today's Syria.

Political history 

The French, following the Ottoman policies which encouraged the nomadic tribes to become sedentary, established several villages and towns since the beginning of their rule. Hasakah was founded in 1922, Qamishli in 1926. In the late 1930s a small but vigorous separatist movement emerged in Qamishli. With some support from French Mandate authorities, the movement actively lobbied for autonomy directly under French rule and its separation from Syria on the ground that the majority of the inhabitants were not Arabs. Syrian nationalists saw the movement as a profound threat to their eventual rule. The Syrian nationalists allied with local Arab Shammar tribal leader and Kurdish tribes. They together attacked the Christian movement in many towns and villages. Local Kurdish tribes who were allies of Shammar tribe sacked and burned the Assyrian (Syriac) town of Amuda. In 1941, the Assyrian (Syriac) community of al-Malikiyah was subjected to a vicious assault. Even though the assault failed, Assyrians (Syriacs) felt threatened and left in large numbers, and the immigration of Kurds from Turkey to the area converted al-Malikiya, al-Darbasiyah and Amuda to Kurdish-majority cities.

Between 1932 and 1939, a Kurdish-Assyrian autonomy movement emerged in Jazira. The demands of the movement were autonomous status similar to the Sanjak of Alexandretta, the protection of French troops, promotion of Kurdish language in schools and hiring of Kurdish officials. The movement was led by Michel Dome, mayor of Qamishli, Hanna Hebe, general vicar for the Syriac-Catholic Patriarch of Jazira, and the Kurdish notable Hajo Agha. Some Arab tribes supported the autonomists while others sided with the central government. In the legislative elections of 1936, autonomist candidates won all the parliamentary seats in Jazira and Jarabulus, while the nationalist Arab movement known as the National Bloc won the elections in the rest of Syria. After victory, the National Bloc pursued an aggressive policy toward the autonomists. In July 1937, armed conflict broke out between the Syrian police and the supporters of the movement. As a result, the governor and a significant portion of the police force fled the region and the rebels established local autonomous administration in Jazira. In August 1937 a number of Assyrians in Amuda were killed by a pro-Damascus Kurdish chief. In September 1938, Hajo Agha chaired a general conference in Jazira and appealed to France for self-government. The new French High Commissioner, Gabriel Puaux, dissolved parliament and created autonomous administrations for Jabal Druze, Latakia and Jazira in 1939 which lasted until 1943.

Economy 
The Governorate has a decade long history of farming. Already in 1921, the French wanted to develop the agricultural sector and over a feasibility study of the Union Economique de Syrie the region was seen profitable for the cotton production. With the outbreak of World War II in 1939, the agricultural expansion grew significantly. When the USA instated a control on cotton exports during the Korean War, the cotton production in the province increased eightfold. By 1960s, the province had the second largest amount of cultivated land in Syria per capita, but was still the lowest in terms of cultivable land per capita. Other economic branches are wheat and oil. Before the eruption of the Syrian Civil the province accounted for about half of the Syrian oil production.

Demographics 
Al-Hasakah Governorate's ethnic groups include Kurds, Arabs, Syriac-Aramaic Christians (Assyrians), Armenians and Yazidis. The majority of the Arabs and Kurds in the region are Sunni Muslim. Between 20 and 30% of the people of Al-Hasakeh city are Christians of various churches and denominations (majority Syriac Orthodox).

Until the beginning of the 20th century, al-Hasakah Governorate (then called Jazira province) was a “no man’s land” primarily reserved for the grazing land of nomadic and semi-nomadic tribes. During the late days of the Ottoman Empire, large Kurdish-speaking tribal groups both settled in and were deported to areas of northern Syria from Anatolia. The largest of these tribal groups was the Reshwan confederation, which was initially based in Adıyaman Province but eventually also settled throughout Anatolia. The Milli confederation, mentioned in 1518 onward, was the most powerful group and dominated the entire northern Syrian steppe in the second half of the 18th century. Danish writer C. Niebuhr who traveled to Jazira in 1764 recorded five nomadic Kurdish tribes (Dukurie, Kikie, Schechchanie, Mullie and Aschetie) and six Arab tribes (Tay, Kaab, Baggara, Geheish, Diabat and Sherabeh). According to Niebuhr, the Kurdish tribes were settled near Mardin in Turkey, and paid the governor of that city for the right to graze their herds in the Syrian Jazira. The Kurdish tribes gradually settled in villages and cities and are still present in the modern governorate).

The demographics of northern Syria saw a huge shift in the early part of the 20th century when the Ottoman Empire (Turks) conducted ethnic cleansing of its Armenian and Assyrian Christian populations and some Kurdish tribes joined in the atrocities committed against them. Many Assyrians fled to Syria during the genocide and settled mainly in the Jazira area. During WWI and subsequent years, thousands of Assyrians fled their homes in Anatolia after massacres. After that, massive waves of Kurds fled their homes in Turkey due to conflict with Kemalist authorities and settled in Syria, where they were granted citizenship by the French Mandate authorities. The number of Kurds settled in the Jazira province during the 1920s was estimated at 20,000 people. Starting in 1926, the region witnessed another huge immigration wave of Kurds following the failure of the Sheikh Said rebellion against the Turkish authorities. Tens of thousands of Kurds fled their homes in Turkey and settled in Syria, and as usual, were granted citizenship by the French mandate authorities. This large influx of Kurds moved to Syria's Jazira province. It is estimated that 25,000 Kurds fled at this time to Syria. The French official reports show the existence of at most 45 Kurdish villages in Jazira prior to 1927. A new wave of refugees arrived in 1929. The mandatory authorities continued to encourage Kurdish immigration into Syria, and by 1939, the villages numbered between 700 and 800. French authorities were not opposed to the streams of Assyrians, Armenians or Kurds who, for various reasons, had left their homes and had found refuge in Syria. The French authorities themselves generally organized the settlement of the refugees. One of the most important of these plans was carried out in Upper Jazira in northeastern Syria where the French built new towns and villages (such as Qamishli) were built with the intention of housing the refugees considered to be “friendly”. This has encouraged the non-Turkish minorities that were under Turkish pressure to leave their ancestral homes and property, they could find refuge and rebuild their lives in relative safety in neighboring Syria. Consequently, the border areas in al-Hasakah Governorate started to have a Kurdish majority, while Arabs remained the majority in river plains and elsewhere.

In 1939, French mandate authorities reported the following population numbers for the different ethnic and religious groups in al-Hasakah governorate.

The population of the governorate reached 155,643 in 1949, including about 60,000 Kurds. These continuous waves swelled the number of Kurds in the area who represented 30% of the Jazira population in a 1939 French authorities census. In 1953, French geographers Fevret and Gibert estimated that out of the total 146,000 inhabitants of Jazira, agriculturalist Kurds made up 60,000 (41%), semi-sedentary and nomad Arabs 50,000 (34%), and a quarter of the population were Christians.

Censuses of 1943 and 1953

Among the Sunni Muslims, mostly Kurds and Arabs, there were about 1,500 Circassians in 1938.

Current demographics 
The inhabitants of al-Hasakah governorate are composed of different ethnic and cultural groups, the larger groups being Arabs and Kurds in addition to a significant large number of Assyrians and a smaller number of Armenians. The population of the governorate, according to the country's official census, was 1,275,118, and was estimated to be 1,377,000 in 2007, and 1,512,000 in 2011.

According to the National Association of Arab Youth, there are 1717 villages in Al-Hasakah province: 1161 Arab villages, 453 Kurdish villages, 98 Assyrian villages and 53 with mixed populations from the aforementioned ethnicities.

Today, Arabs comprise the largest demographic group and mostly live in the city of al-Hasaka and its south and east countryside, with smaller presence in the north and west countryside. Kurds are the second largest group, with thousands living in villages and towns in the north, northeast, and northwest countryside. Assyrians live mostly in the north and northeast regions of al-Hasaka, especially in Tell Tamer but also in Qamishli and al-Malikiyah.In 2013 there was en estimated 200,000 Assyrians in Hasakah province

Cities, towns and villages 
This list includes all cities, towns and villages with more than 5,000 inhabitants. The population figures are given according to the 2004 official census:

Districts and sub-districts 

The governorate is divided into four districts (manatiq). The districts are further divided into 16 sub-districts (nawahi):

 Al-Hasakah District (7 sub-districts)
 Bir al-Helou al-Wardiya Subdistrict
 Al-Hawl Subdistrict
 Al-Hasakah Subdistrict
 Tell Tamer Subdistrict
 Al-Arishah Subdistrict
 Al-Shaddadah Subdistrict
 Markada Subdistrict

 Al-Malikiyah District (3 sub-districts)
 Al-Malikiyah Subdistrict
 Al-Yaarubiyah Subdistrict
 Al-Jawadiyah Subdistrict
 Qamishli District (4 sub-districts)
 Al-Qahtaniyah Subdistrict
 Tell Hamis Subdistrict
 Qamishli Subdistrict
 Amuda Subdistrict
 Ras al-Ayn District (2 sub-districts)
 Ras al-Ayn Subdistrict
 Al-Darbasiyah Subdistrict

Archaeology
The most prominent archaeological sites are:

Hamoukar:considered by some archaeologists to be the oldest city in the world
Tell Halaf: Excavations have revealed successive civilization levels, Neolithic glazed pottery and basalt sculptures.
Tell Brak: Situated halfway between al-Hasakah city and the frontier town of Qamishli.  Excavations in the tell have revealed the Uyun Temple and King Naram-Sin's palace-stronghold.
Tell el Fakhariya
Tell Hittin: 15 layers of occupation have been identified.
Tell Leilan: Excavations began in 1975 and have revealed many artefacts and buildings dating back to the 6th millennium BC such as a bazaar, temple, palace, etc.

Notes

References

External links
ehasakeh The First Complete website for Al-Hasakah news and services

 
Governorates of Syria
Assyrian geography
Upper Mesopotamia